At the 1997 Jeux de la Francophonie, the athletics events were held in Antananarivo, Madagascar in August and September 1997. A total of 43 events were contested, of which 23 by male and 20 by female athletes. Of the forty nations present at the competition, fifteen reached the medal table in the athletics competition.

The regional leader France easily topped the medal table with eleven gold medals and 38 in total. This was almost twice as many as second placed Canada (seven golds and twenty altogether). The hosts Madagascar had a strong showing in third place with seven golds and 16 medals – a performance which helped it into second place in the medals at the games. Senegal and Romania were the next best performers with four golds each.

A total of eight games records were set during the competition. On the men's side, Jean-Olivier Zirignon won the 100 metres in 10.07 seconds, Alejandro Argudin ran 49.22 seconds for the 400 metres hurdles, the high jump saw Mike Caza and Khemraj Naiko both reach 2.23 m, Cheikh Touré won the long jump with 8.19 m and Bouna Diop set a new javelin throw standard of 75.82 m. On the women's side Denisa Costescu ran 16:44.2 minutes to win the inaugural 5000 metres title (which replaced the previous 3000 metres event), Laurence Manfredi threw a record of 16.70 m in the shot put and Kim Vanderhoek set a heptathlon games best of 5650 points.

Medal summary

Men

Women

Medal table

References
Notes

Sources
 Francophone Games. GBRathletics. Retrieved on 2013-05-06.
Resultats. Francophonie. Retrieved on 2013-05-06.

1997
Francophonie
Athletics
Athletics in Madagascar